Manon 70 is a 1968 drama film directed by Jean Aurel, and starring Catherine Deneuve, Elsa Martinelli, Sami Frey, Robert Webber, Paul Hubschmid and Jean-Claude Brialy. The screenplay by Aurel and Cécil Saint-Laurent is loosely based on the 1731 novel Manon Lescaut by Antoine François Prévost. The original music was composed by Serge Gainsbourg.

Synopsis
Manon is an amoral, free spirit who uses sex to surround herself in relatively luxurious surroundings. Journalist François sees her at the airport and falls in love with her. Once they land in Paris, he makes his move and steals her from the man she has been traveling with. François and Manon fall in love but Manon's brother, wants to live off his sister and causes trouble. Manon tries seeing a wealthy man at the same time as François.

Cast
 Catherine Deneuve as Manon
 Jean-Claude Brialy as Jean-Paul
 Sami Frey as François Des Grieux
 Elsa Martinelli as Annie
 Robert Webber as Ravaggi
 Paul Hubschmid as Simon
 Claude Génia as wife
 Jean Martin as hotel manager

Reception
Deneuve later said she wanted to work with Jean Aurel because she enjoys his film All About Loving (1964). Of Manon 70, she said, "The story was great but the film just missed.... it's probably because the director was not at his best."

References

External links
 
 
 

1968 films
1968 drama films
1960s French films
1960s French-language films
1960s German films
1960s Italian films
Films based on French novels
Films based on works by Antoine François Prévost
Films directed by Jean Aurel
Films produced by Robert Dorfmann
Films scored by Serge Gainsbourg
French drama films
French-language German films
French-language Italian films
German drama films
Italian drama films
West German films